In enzymology, a D-alanine 2-hydroxymethyltransferase is an enzyme that catalyzes the chemical reaction

5,10-methylenetetrahydrofolate + D-alanine + H2O  tetrahydrofolate + 2-methylserine

The 3 substrates of this enzyme are 5,10-methylenetetrahydrofolate, D-alanine, and H2O, whereas its two products are tetrahydrofolate and 2-methylserine.

This enzyme belongs to the family of transferases that transfer one-carbon groups, specifically the hydroxymethyl-, formyl- and related transferases.  The systematic name of this enzyme class is 5,10-methylenetetrahydrofolate:D-alanine 2-hydroxymethyltransferase. This enzyme is also called 2-methylserine hydroxymethyltransferase.  This enzyme participates in one carbon pool by folate.

References 

 

EC 2.1.2
Enzymes of unknown structure